The 1914 Cork Intermediate Hurling Championship was the sixth staging of the Cork Intermediate Hurling Championship since its establishment by the Cork County Board.

Charleville won the championship following a walkover defeat of Shamrocks in the final.

Results

Final

References

Cork Intermediate Hurling Championship
Cork Intermediate Hurling Championship